Aadhalal Kadhal Seiveer is a 2013 Indian Tamil language romantic drama film directed by Suseenthiran. It features debutant Santhosh Ramesh (Singanamala Ramesh's second son) and Manisha Yadav of Vazhakku Enn 18/9 fame in the lead roles. It is produced by Nallu Studios and music by Yuvan Shankar Raja. Cinematography is by Soorya.A.R, editing by Antony, stunts by Anal Arasu, lyrics by Vaali and Yugabharathi. The film released with highly positive reviews. The film was remade in Kannada as Naduve Antaravirali (2018).

Plot

The plot revolves around two college-going students, Karthik and Shwetha, who fall in love. They hail from upper-middle-class families. Shwetha's friend Genni is against their relationship and advises Shwetha to break up with Karthik and focus on her studies and future, but since Shwetha is equally interested in Karthik, she continues to meet him behind Genni's back. But a worried Genni discloses Shwetha's relationship status to the latter's mom, before anyone is ready to open up to their parents. Shwetha tackles her mom by blaming Genni's jealousy and lies that she is still single. Karthik and Shwetha continue to see each other in secrecy, and on one such weekend getaway, they have sex. Within few weeks, Shwetha finds that she has missed her period and suspects that she might be pregnant, which she confides in Karthik and a few common friends.

On their idea, they try to abort the foetus, posing as a married couple. But the doctor gets suspicious when they answer irrelevantly and chucks them out. While they try to find other means to perform the abortion, Shwetha's mother, who was already suspicious of her activities since Genni's warning, finds out the truth, and then all hell breaks loose. After the initial commotion and arguments, Shwetha's parents want to get the couple married to avoid further disgrace. But Karthik's dad is not interested since his reputation will be ruined. The lovers, on the other hand, plan to elope, but Shwetha changes her mind halfway. One argument leads to another, and the rift between the couple and their families continues to widen. Karthik's parents agree to a wedding on the condition that Shwetha aborts the foetus, so that they can focus on their future and well-being. Shwetha is scared that they might change their mind later on and call off the wedding once her abortion is done, so she refuses to abort. To add fuel to the fire, Shwetha's parents are insulted by Karthik's relatives when they try to patch them up and proceed further smoothly. Ego clashes and insults rage between the families; at one point, Shwetha and Karthik find that they are not compatible anymore, so they break up bitterly.

Finally, a few months later, a baby boy is born, and Shwetha's dad leaves him in an orphanage. Two years later, we find that Shwetha is happily getting engaged to someone else;  Karthik is busy in a coffee shop flirting with another girl; and the little child is growing up in the orphanage without parental love and care.

Cast
 Santhosh Ramesh as Karthik
 Manisha Yadav as Shwetha
 Jayaprakash as Shweta's father
 Thulasi as Shweta's mother
 Poornima Jayaram as Karthi's mother
 Varun as Karthik & Shweta's friend
 Ramnath Shetty as Karthi's father
 Arjunan as Jai
 Archana Raja as Genelia
 Durga as Karthik's sister
 Srinidhi Vasudevan as Radhi

Production
After Rajapattai, which was based on a script by a friend, Suseenthiran went back to new scripts and chose Aadhalaal Kadhal Seiveer. "This is a story that has never been explored before in Tamil cinema. You cannot classify this film as mainstream. The enormous impact of the script will be felt in the film’s second half", he said. Santhosh, a third year Loyola College student, plays the hero, while Manisha Yadav, who played one of the leads in the critically acclaimed Vazhakku Enn 18/9, the heroine. Some students from both Loyola and MOP Vaishnav colleges have acted in the film. Actor Poornima Bhagyaraj makes a comeback with this film. Apart from her, actors Jayaprakash, Thulasi and Arjun, who played a commendable role in Kadhalil Sodhapuvadhu Eppadi, are the other three familiar faces in the cast. The rest are newcomers. For the film all artistes attended a two-month rehearsal.

Suseenthiran came up with the script of Aadhalal Kadhal Seiveer while chatting with a friend who was talking about one of his relatives, a college girl, who had fallen in love. "As he discussed her story, several issues one would normally not associate with a couple in love emerged. The impact was such that I was prompted to make a movie out of the story," says Suseenthiran. Suseenthiran has convinced the young music director Yuvan Shankar Raja to appear in a music video for a song from the film. Unlike most other films, this film's title will not be showcased at the beginning but at the end.

Soundtrack

The soundtrack of the film was composed by Yuvan Shankar Raja. There are six songs but only four will be featured in the album as the director feels that the lyrics of the other two songs would give out the plot details. These two songs will only be a part of the film. The audio launch was held on 17 October at Sathyam Cinemas, Chennai. The first audio CD was released by actor Mohan and received by director-actor K. Bhagyaraj.

The music was praised by critics. Behindwoods wrote, "Yuvan Shankar Raja proves why he is the 'Little Maestro' in the finale of the movie and the little pathos song sung by Yuvan himself, will surely move you". The Hindu wrote, "topping the list of other highlights is Yuvan Shankar Raja’s score. The songs have been chartbusters for quite a while. Now you notice his RR beautifully enhancing the mood of the sequences". The New Indian Express wrote, "Yuvan Shankar Raja’s background score is a key strength to the film". Rediff wrote, "music by Yuvan Shankar Raja is melodious and pleasing to the ear, particularly the Poovum Poovum number by Vijay Yesudas and Vinaitha". Sify wrote, "Yuvan Shankar Raja’s music is peppy and the pathos song sung by the music director in the climax and picturised on the child artist is heart-warming and will move you to tears".

Release
It was released by Udhayanidhi Stalin's Red Giant Movies though Studio Green had initially acquired the distribution rights of the film. The film which supposed to hit screens on 23 August 2013 was advanced to 15 August, on Independence day.

Reception
Suganth of The Times of India gave 3.5 stars out of 5 and called Aadhalal Kadhal Seiveer, "a return to form for the director after the misfire that was Rajapattai. Malini Mannath of The New Indian Express wrote, "Aadhalal Kadhal Seiveer comes as a breath of fresh air. Clear and focused in its screenplay, it is sensitive in handling the issue of premarital sex and teen pregnancy. Brilliantly narrated by Suseenthiran, it capsules a relevant issue in just 106 minutes. Aadhalal Kadhal Seiveer is an experience not to be missed". Sify wrote, "Suseenthiran is back in form with his latest realistic Aadhalal Kadhal Seiveer. He has come out with a different kind of film which is sure to pull at your heartstrings and at the same time make you think of the realities of life". S Saraswathi of Rediff gave 3 stars out of 5 and wrote "Aadhalaal Kaadhal Seiveer is a must watch. A simple and honest screenplay with a liberal dose of realism coupled with some excellent editing, but most of all, the totally unexpected climax, sets this film apart". Malathi Rangarajan of The Hindu wrote, "Nearly two years after Rajapaatai, Suseenthiran bounces back with AKS that has a neatly told story and a finale that touches an interesting emotional acme". Indo-Asian News Service wrote, "Suseenthiran handles the film bravely without compromising on the message it sets out to deliver to its audiences. Any story dealing with a social problem is either extremely preachy or overtly melodramatic, but what we get here is an intelligent output sans cliches. Kudos to the director for writing and narrating an impactful story". Behindwoods wrote, "AKS is a 'slice of life' tale topped by a really impactful climax. Suseenthiran is back in form with a short impactful teenage romance".

References

External links
 

2013 films
Indian romantic drama films
2013 romantic drama films
Films directed by Suseenthiran
Indian pregnancy films
2010s Tamil-language films
Teenage pregnancy in film
Tamil films remade in other languages